Vicky Ki Taxi is a TV show that aired on the Indian channel Real TV and it premiered on 6 March 2009. The story revolves around Vicky and his taxi 'Jaaneman’. The show was written  by Vipul K Rawal.

Cast 

 Pawan Shankar as Vicky
 Kurush Deboo as Pinto, the garage owner
 Deepak Advani as Vicky's friend
 Mushtaq Khan as Shetty, the hotelier
 Vaishnavvi shukla as grand daughter of Reema Lagoo

References

Real (TV channel) original programming
2009 Indian television series debuts
2009 Indian television series endings
Indian drama television series